The bird genus  Eremophila comprises the two horned larks.

Taxonomy and systematics
The current genus name is from Ancient Greek eremos, "desert", and phileo, "to love".

Extant species

Extinct species
There is at least one fossil species included in this genus:

 †Eremophila orkhonensis (late Pliocene of Central Asia, synonym = Pliocalcarius orkhonensis)
 †Eremophila prealpestris (late Pliocene of Varshets, Bulgaria)

Description
Unlike most other larks, these are distinctive looking species with striking head and face patterns, black and white in Temminck's lark and black and yellow in most horned larks. In the summer males of both species have black "horns", which give these larks their alternative names.

Distribution and habitat
These are larks of open country which nest on the ground. The migratory horned lark breeds across much of northern North America, Europe and Asia and in the mountains of Europe. Temminck's lark is mainly a resident breeding species across much of north Africa, through northern Arabia to western Iraq.

References

 
Bird genera